Marek Jan Koźmiński (born 7 February 1971 in Kraków) is a retired Polish footballer who played as a left-sided defender or midfielder.

Career

Club
He played for clubs such as Hutnik Kraków, Udinese (Italy), Brescia (Italy), AC Ancona (Italy), PAOK Thessaloniki (Greece) and Górnik Zabrze.

International
He made 45 appearances for the Poland national team. Koźmiński was a participant at the 1992 Summer Olympics, where Poland won the silver medal, and at the 2002 FIFA World Cup.

International goal

References

External links
 

1971 births
Living people
Polish footballers
Olympic footballers of Poland
Olympic silver medalists for Poland
Poland international footballers
Polish expatriate sportspeople in Italy
Expatriate footballers in Italy
Expatriate footballers in Greece
Polish expatriate footballers
Udinese Calcio players
Brescia Calcio players
A.C. Ancona players
PAOK FC players
Górnik Zabrze players
Hutnik Nowa Huta players
Footballers at the 1992 Summer Olympics
2002 FIFA World Cup players
Footballers from Kraków
Ekstraklasa players
Serie A players
Serie B players
Super League Greece players
Olympic medalists in football
Medalists at the 1992 Summer Olympics
Association football midfielders